The Maserati Project24 is a limited-production high performance track day special by Italian marque Maserati. The Project24 is a derivative of the Maserati MC20, with significant weight savings and more advanced aerodynamics. The Nettuno engine found in the MC20 has also undergone changes to produce more power. Customers who purchase the car will be able to customise it via Maserati's Fuoriserie (custom-built) program, and production will be limited to 62 units.

Specifications
Built upon a wholly carbon-fibre monocoque, the car features significant use of carbon-fibre along with other natural fibres to significantly lower the weight compared to the road-legal MC20. Double wishbone suspension along with adjustable dampers, front and rear anti-roll bars provide ride height control for the car. Stopping power is provided by ventilated carbon ceramic Brembos. Other features include a FIA-standard  fuel tank, along with a FIA-standard fire extinguisher and roll cage. Air-conditioning, a feature traditionally not found on track-focused cars, is also standard along with a seat for a passenger.

References

Maserati vehicles
Cars introduced in 2022